Bicyclus italus, the large bush brown, is a butterfly in the family Nymphalidae. It is found in Ghana, Togo, Nigeria, Cameroon, Bioko, Gabon, the Republic of the Congo, the Central African Republic and the Democratic Republic of the Congo. The habitat consists of forests, including drier forests.

References

Seitz, A. Die Gross-Schmetterlinge der Erde 13: Die Afrikanischen Tagfalter. Plate XIII 26

Elymniini
Butterflies described in 1865
Butterflies of Africa
Taxa named by William Chapman Hewitson